Four Mile Bay is a bay on Trout Lake in the city of North Bay, Nipissing District in Northeastern Ontario, Canada. 

The community of Camp Champlain is on it southern shore, and Four Mile Creek enters Trout Lake at the bay.

References

Landforms of Nipissing District
Bays of Ontario